Jacob Wester (born 17 November 1987 in Stockholm, Sweden) is a Swedish freeskier.

Skiing
Jacob began Skiing at the age of five, but only appeared onto the freeskiing scene in 2005 when he finished second place at the Jon Olsson Invitational, later that year he won the "Air We Go" in Oslo, Norway. Jacob has been mentored by pro freeskier and fellow countryman Jon Olsson, with both him and Jon pushing the "doubles movement", doing tricks like double flips and double corks.

Personal life
Jacob moved out of his parents house, in late 2008, and into an apartment just outside Stockholm, he lives with his girlfriend Sofia Sjöberg. When he's not skiing, Jacob goes surfing for at least 75 days of the year. Since being taught by Jon Olsson in June off 2006 while in Brazil he has surfed in Bali, Africa and Orange County, California. Jacob also ice skates and fishes on the lake near his apartment. Although he admits he has never been never a great artist, Jacob has recently started to practice tattooing, using a kit Sofia brought him for his birthday, he practices on fruits, fake skin, and his legs in the hope he can do it professionally once his skiing career is over. His brother, Oscar Wester, also represents Sweden in skiing.

Results
2009   3rd Sweet Rumble Big Air, Trysil, Norway
2009   3rd Winter X Games XIII, Big Air, Aspen, Colorado
2008   1st Freestyle.ch, Big Air, Zürich, Switzerland
2008   1st Icer Air, Big Air, San Francisco
2008   1st North American Open, Slopestyle,                    Breckenridge, Colorado
2008   4th London Freeze Big Air, London
2008   4th King Of Style, Big Air Stockholm Sweden
2007 	10th King Of Style, Big Air, Stockholm, Sweden
2007 	2nd Jon Olsson Invitational, Big Air 	Åre, Sweden  	 	
2007 	2nd US Open, Big Air, 	                Cooper, Colorado 	 	
2006 	8th Freestyle.ch, Big Air, Zürich, Switzerland
2006 	13th World Skiing Invitational, Superpipe,   	Whistler, BC, Canada
2006 	6th Orage European Freeskiing Open, Superpipe,  	Laax, Switzerland  		
2006 	5th Orage European Freeskiing Open, Slopestyle,  	Laax, Switzerland 	
2005 	1st Air We Go, Big Air, 	                Oslo, Norway
2005 	4th N.Z. Free Ski Open, Slopestyle,  	        Wanaka, New Zealand
2005 	2nd Jon Olsson Invitational, Big Air, 	Åre, Sweden 	 	
2005 	4th US Open, Big Air, Vail, Colorado

References

External links
 His personal blog
 His profile at Matchstick productions
 His profile at Oakley
 An interview with Newschoolers

1987 births
Living people
Swedish male freestyle skiers
Freeskiers
X Games athletes
Sportspeople from Stockholm
21st-century Swedish people